The AVC qualification for the 2010 FIVB Volleyball Men's World Championship saw member nations compete for four places at the finals in Italy.

Draw
23 of the 65 AVC national teams entered qualification. (Uzbekistan and Saudi Arabia later withdrew) The teams were distributed according to their position in the FIVB Senior Men's Rankings as of 5 January 2008 using the serpentine system for their distribution. (Rankings shown in brackets) Teams ranked 1–4 did not compete in the first and second rounds, and automatically qualified for the third round. Teams ranked 5–10 did not compete in the first round, and automatically qualified for the second round.

First round

Second round

Third round

First round

Pool A
 Venue:  Te Rauparaha Arena, Porirua, New Zealand
 Dates: 22–24 April 2009
 All times are New Zealand Standard Time (UTC+12:00)

|}

|}

Pool B
 Venue:  Liaquat Gymnasium, Islamabad, Pakistan
 Dates: 28–30 January 2009
 All times are Pakistan Standard Time (UTC+05:00)

|}

|}

Pool C
 Venue:  Sultan Qaboos Sports Complex, Muscat, Oman
 Dates: 2–4 May 2009
 All times are Gulf Standard Time (UTC+04:00)

|}

|}

Second round

Pool D
 Venue:  Azadi Volleyball Hall, Tehran, Iran
 Dates: 25–27 May 2009
 All times are Iran Daylight Time (UTC+04:30)

|}

|}

Pool E
 Venue:  Nakhon Pathom Sport Center, Nakhon Pathom, Thailand
 Dates: 9–11 June 2009
 All times are Indochina Time (UTC+07:00)

|}

|}

Pool F
 Venue:  Taipei Gymnasium, Taipei, Taiwan
 Dates: 22–24 May 2009
 All times are Chungyuan Standard Time (UTC+08:00)

|}

|}

Third round

Pool G
 Venue:  Sichuan Provincial Gymnasium, Chengdu, China
 Dates: 14–16 August 2009
 All times are China Standard Time (UTC+08:00)

|}

|}

Pool H
 Venue:  Park Arena, Komaki, Japan
 Dates: 28–30 August 2009
 All times are Japan Standard Time (UTC+09:00)

|}

|}

References

External links
 2010 World Championship Qualification

2010 FIVB Volleyball Men's World Championship
2009 in volleyball
FIVB Volleyball World Championship qualification